John W. Dower (born June 21, 1938 in Providence, Rhode Island) is an American author and historian. His 1999 book Embracing Defeat: Japan in the Wake of World War II won the U.S. National Book Award for Nonfiction, the Pulitzer Prize for General Nonfiction, the Bancroft Prize, the Los Angeles Times Book Prize, the Mark Lynton History Prize, and the John K. Fairbank Prize of the American Historical Association.

Career 
Dower earned a bachelor's degree in American Studies from Amherst College in 1959, and a PhD in History and Far Eastern Languages from Harvard University in 1972, where he studied under Albert M. Craig. He expanded his doctoral dissertation, a biography of former Japanese Prime Minister Shigeru Yoshida, into the book Empire and Aftermath. His other books include a selection of writings by E. Herbert Norman and a study of mutual images during World War II entitled War Without Mercy.

Dower was the executive producer of the Academy Award-nominated documentary Hellfire: A Journey from Hiroshima, and was a member of the Committee of Concerned Asian Scholars, sitting on the editorial board of its journal with Noam Chomsky, and Herbert Bix. He has taught at the University of Wisconsin–Madison and the University of California, San Diego, and is a Ford International Professor of History, Emeritus, at MIT.

Visualizing Cultures

"Visualizing Cultures", a course that Dower has taught at MIT since 2003 with Shigeru Miyagawa, discusses how images shape American and Japanese societies. The Visualizing Cultures website features some 18 scholars in over 40 units based on digitized image sets from the visual record. The project was recognized by MIT with the "Class of 1960 Innovation in Education Award" in 2004 and in 2005, the National Endowment for the Humanities selected VC for inclusion on "EDSITEment" as an online resource for education in the humanities. The curriculum on the website for the Canton Trade unit won the 2011 "Franklin R. Buchanan prize from the Association of Asian Studies for best curricular materials concerning Asia."

The first Visualizing Cultures unit, "Black Ships & Samurai," written by John Dower, juxtaposed the visual record from the two sides of the 1853–1854 encounter when Commodore Matthew Perry of the United States arrived in Japan aboard the "Black Ships" (steam powered gunboats) to force that long-secluded country to open its borders to the outside world.

In April 2006, the OpenCourseWare website of "Visualizing Cultures" was announced on the main page of the MIT website, causing a stir among some Chinese students at MIT that found the material offensive. The material included woodblock prints produced in Japan as propaganda during the Chinese-Japanese War of 1894–1895 that portrayed Japanese soldiers beheading "violent Chinese soldiers." The Japanese-born Miyagawa received death threats. In response, the authors temporarily removed the course from OpenCourseWare and released a statement, as did the MIT Administration. After a week, the course authors agreed to include additional context in controversial sections, and put the course back online.

Awards and honors

1986 National Book Critics Circle Award, War Without Mercy: Race and Power in the Pacific War
2000 Pulitzer Prize for General Nonfiction, Embracing Defeat: Japan in the Wake of World War II 
2000 L.L. Winship/PEN New England Award, Embracing Defeat: Japan in the Wake of World War II
2000 Bancroft Prize, Embracing Defeat: Japan in the Wake of World War II Mellon Distinguished Achievement Award
2007, elected to the American Philosophical Society

Selected works
 Books 
 Origins of the Modern Japanese State: Selected Writings of E.H. Norman  (1975; Pantheon)
 War Without Mercy: Race and Power in the Pacific War (1986; Pantheon)
 Empire and Aftermath: Yoshida Shigeru and the Japanese experience, 1878–1954 (1988; Harvard University Press)
 Japan in War and Peace: Selected Essays (1995; New Press)
 "The Bombed: Hiroshima and Nagasaki in Japanese Memory", Diplomatic History 19, no. 2 (Spring 1995)
 Embracing Defeat: Japan in the Wake of World War II (1999; W. W. Norton) — winner of the National Book Award, John K. Fairbank Prize of the American Historical Association, and Pulitzer Prize
 Cultures of War: Pearl Harbor, Hiroshima, 9-11, Iraq (New York: Norton : New Press, 2010 ).
 Ways of Forgetting, Ways of Remembering: Japan in the Modern World (The New Press, 2011)
 The Violent American Century: War and Terror Since World War II'' (Haymarket Books, 2017 ).

Interviews and presentations

References

External links
 
 Faculty website
 New York Times Magazine interview
 Amherst College Honorary Doctorate announcement
 Visualizing Cultures: Website created by Dower
 On the "Visualizing Cultures" Controversy and Its Implications, by MIT CSSA
 Reflections on the "Visualizing Cultures" Incident, by Peter C. Perdue
 
 John W. Dower (AC 1959) Papers at the Amherst College Archives & Special Collections

1938 births
Living people
Amherst College alumni
Harvard Graduate School of Arts and Sciences alumni
Historians of Japan
Pulitzer Prize for General Non-Fiction winners
University of California, San Diego faculty
University of Wisconsin–Madison faculty
Writers from Providence, Rhode Island
National Book Award winners
MIT School of Humanities, Arts, and Social Sciences faculty
Historians of American foreign relations
20th-century American historians
American male non-fiction writers
21st-century American historians
Bancroft Prize winners
20th-century American male writers